Don't Do It is the debut solo album by American rapper Richie Rich. The album was released in 1990 on Big League Records, Inc.

Track listing
"Don't Do It" 4:06
"Rodney The Geek" 4:30
"Free At Last" 5:14
"Media Hype" (featuring D-Loc) 4:19
"The Mic Is Mine" 4:26
"Lady Ace" (featuring Lady Ace) 2:09
"Female F.E.D." 4:06
"Side Show" 3:55
"The Picnic" 4:26
"5 MC's" (featuring D-Loc) 4:12
"Don't Do It" (Long Version)

Samples
Don't Do It
"Outstanding" by The Gap Band
5MC's
"La Di Da Di" by Doug E. Fresh and Slick Rick
"Dana Dane With Fame" by Dana Dane
The Mic Is Mine
"La Di Da Di" by Doug E. Fresh and Slick Rick
"Before I Let Go" by Maze

References

External links
[ Don't Do It] at Allmusic
Don't Do It at Discogs

Richie Rich (rapper) albums
1990 debut albums